Davide Giugliano (born 28 October 1989) is a motorcycle racer from Italy, winner of the FIM Superstock 1000 Cup in 2011.

Career

In 2005 he made his debut in Superstock 600 and in 2007 he moved to Supersport riding a Kawasaki ZX-6R. From 2008 to 2011 he had competed in FIM Superstock 1000 Cup, winning the championship in 2011 season with Ducati 1098R. From 2012 to 2016 he has been a regular rider in the Superbike World Championship.

For 2017, he started the season in the British Superbike Championship, riding a BMW S1000RR for Tyco BMW Motorrad Racing; he and the team split after an injury sustained in the second round.

Career statistics

Supersport World Championship

Races by year
(key) (Races in bold indicate pole position, races in italics indicate fastest lap)

Superbike World Championship

Races by year
(key) (Races in bold indicate pole position, races in italics indicate fastest lap)

References

External links
 
 
 

1989 births
Living people
Italian motorcycle racers
Superbike World Championship riders
Supersport World Championship riders
FIM Superstock 1000 Cup riders
Sportspeople from Rome
British Superbike Championship riders